Henry Logan (April 14, 1784 – December 26, 1866) was an American politician from Pennsylvania who served as a Democratic member of the U.S. House of Representatives for Pennsylvania's 11th congressional district from 1835 to 1839.

Henry Logan was born near Dillsburg, Pennsylvania.  He volunteered for the defense of Baltimore in 1814 during the War of 1812, and served as captain in the Nineteenth Regiment, Second Brigade, Fifth Division, Pennsylvania Militia.  He was commissioned lieutenant colonel August 1, 1814.

He served as a member of the Pennsylvania House of Representatives from 1818 and 1819 and as a member of the Pennsylvania State Senate for the 14th district from 1828 to 1830.

Logan was elected as a Jacksonian to the Twenty-fourth Congress and reelected as a Democrat to the Twenty-fifth Congress.  He was not a candidate for renomination and resumed farming.

He was a member of the Board of Commissioners of York County, Pennsylvania, in 1840.  He served as county auditor and died on the Logania plantation in Monaghan Township, near Dillsburg in 1866.  Interment in the Dillsburg Cemetery in Dillsburg, Pennsylvania.

Legacy
The town Loganville, Pennsylvania was named after him.

Footnotes

Sources

The Political Graveyard

|-

|-

1784 births
1866 deaths
19th-century American politicians
American Presbyterians
Burials in Pennsylvania
County auditors in the United States
Democratic Party members of the United States House of Representatives from Pennsylvania
Jacksonian members of the United States House of Representatives from Pennsylvania
Democratic Party members of the Pennsylvania House of Representatives
Pennsylvania militia
Democratic Party Pennsylvania state senators
People from Dillsburg, Pennsylvania
People from Pennsylvania in the War of 1812

York County Commissioners (Pennsylvania)